Grace Schools is a co-educational school founded in Gbagada, Lagos, Nigeria in the year 1968. The school is divided into four sections: the Nursery, the Primary, Secondary School and the Pre-University.

History
The school was founded by Deaconess Grace Bisola Oshinowo. It started its high school in 1994. Facilities in the school include:

Air-Conditioned Classrooms
Technical Workshop
Sciences Laboratory
Library
Zoo
Art Studios
Clinic
Ultramodern Multipurpose Hall
Sports Field

References

External links
Official website

Secondary schools in Lagos State
Schools in Lagos
Educational institutions established in 1968
1968 establishments in Nigeria